Banmore is a town, tehsil and a nagar panchayat in Morena district in the state of Madhya Pradesh, India.Banmore Pin Code is 476444 Banmore comes under Morena district. PIN Code is also known as Zip Code or Postal Code.

Demographics
 India census, Banmore had a population of 25,222. Males constitute 54% of the population and females 46%. Banmore has an average literacy rate of 58%, lower than the national average of 59.5%; with 65% of the males and 35% of females literate. 18% of the population is under 6 years of age.

good References

Government Website District Morena

Cities and towns in Morena district
Morena